Golapganj Upazila , previously known as Gulabganj, is an upazila of Sylhet District in the Division of Sylhet, Bangladesh.

Geography 

Golapganj Upazila (Sylhet District) area 278.34 km2, located in between 24°41' and 24°55' north latitudes and in between 91°55' and 92°06' east longitudes. It is bounded by Sylhet Sadar, Jaintiapur and Kanaighat upazilas on the north, Fenchuganj and Barlekha upazilas on the south, Beanibazar and Barlekha on the east, Sylhet Sadar and Dakshin Surma upazila on the west.

Water bodies Main rivers 
surma, kushiyara, Sonai; Singari Beel, Bagha Beel, Fatamati Beel, Parea Beel and Sonadubi Beel are notable.

History 
After the Conquest of Gour in 1303, two disciple of Shah Jalal; Shah Bahauddin and Shah Putla Fattah, migrated to Bhadeshwar in modern-day Golapganj where their mazars remains today.

In 1740, during the reign of Mughal emperor Muhammad Shah, Gulab Ram Ray of Murshidabad was appointed the Dewan of Sylhet with the permission of the Faujdar of Sylhet, Shamsher Khan, and the Nawab of Bengal, Shuja-ud-Din Muhammad Khan. Gulab was a practising Hindu, and was informed about how Krishna Chaitanya's paternal home was in Dhakadakshin (in present-day Golapganj). The Dewan then ordered for a road and bridge to be made from Sylhet town to Dhakadakshin, to make it easier for those wanting to visit the place. When the Dewan reached Chaitanya's home, he built a Hindu temple and created a large pond next to it. From Hetimganj to Dhakadakshin, the road is now known as Dewan Road after Gulab himself. The Dewan's Bridge also remains today as an ancient culvert. The area was also renamed Gulabganj after the Dewan, which eventually changed to Golapganj (although older records mention the name Golabganj).

A thana was founded in Hetimganj originally and then moved to Golabganj Bazaar. The Golabganj Thana was formed in 1906. Revolts in Ronikeli and Bhadeshwar were held during the Nankar Rebellion. In the aftermath of the Bangladesh Liberation War of 1971, a mass grave was found in Sundisail and there remains a monument in the upazila as a memorial. It was upgraded to an upazila in 1983.

Demographics
Total population Golapganj Upzila:263953 male 132189, female 131764; Muslim 252167, Hindu 11725, Buddhist 21, and others 40. Indigenous communities such as manipuri and tripura belong to this upazila.
According to the census 2011, Golapganj Upazila has a population of 316,149. Males constitute 50.29% of the population, and females 49.71%. 48.17% of the population is age eighteen or older. Average Household size 6.23 person and population density is 1136 person per km2. Golapganj has an average literacy rate of 57.0% (7+ years), and the national average of 32.4% literate.

Main sources of income 
Agriculture 34.05%, non-agricultural laborer 6.03%, industry 0.94%, commerce 14.64%, transport and communication 4.01%, service 6.16%, construction 2.88%, religious service 0.58%, rent and remittance 18.34% and others 12.37%. Main crops are Paddy, chilli, pumpkin, arum,' barbati. Nearly extinct crops are Mustard, sesame, linseed. Main fruits are Jackfruit, mango, litchi, banana, latkon, guava, lemon, shaddock, betel nut, coconut.

Ownership of agricultural land 
Landowner 42.76%, landless 57.24%; agricultural landowner: urban 27.98% and rural 43.91%.

Administration
Golapganj Upazila is divided into Golapganj Municipality and 11 union parishads: Amura, Bagha, Bhadeshwar, Budhbaribazar, Dhaka Dakshin, Fulbari, Golapganj, Lakshanaband, Lakshmi Pasha, Sharifganj, and Uttar Badepasha. The union parishads are subdivided into 98 mauzas and 244 villages.

Golapganj Municipality is subdivided into 9 wards and 23 mahallas.

List of chairmen

Education 

There are five colleges in the upazila: Al-Imdad College, Bhadeswar College, Bhadeswar Mohila College, Dhaka Dakshin Degree College, and Kushiara College.

According to Banglapedia, Bhadeshwar Nasiruddin High School, founded in 1919, Dhakadakshin Multilateral High School and College (1898), and MC Academy (1934) are notable secondary schools.

Average literacy 48.24%; male 50.89%, female 45.64%.

Newspapers and periodicals 
G Voice24 Weekly; Golap, Sonar Sylhet.

Tourist spots 
Bangladesh Scouts (Sylhet region), Petrobangla, Kailash Tila and the birthplace of Sri Chaitanya Dev.' Mazar of Bahauddin, house and temple of sri chaitanya Dev, Kailash Tila and Dewan Bridge.

Health centres 
Upazila health centre 1, union health centre 1, health and family planning centre 5, community clinic 11, maternity and child welfare centre 1, diagnostic centre 3, veterinary hospital 1.

Notable people
 Arjumand Ali, first Bengali Muslim novelist
 Abdul Matin Chaudhary, first Agriculture Minister of Pakistan
 Faruque Ahmed, author
 Fatema Chowdhury Paru, politician
 Sadruddin Ahmed Chowdhury, physicist and vice-chancellor of Shahjalal University of Science and Technology and Sylhet International University
 AKM Gouach Uddin, Jatiya Party politician
 Aminul Hoque MBE, lecturer at Goldsmiths, University of London, writer
 Syed Makbul Hossain, doctor and politician
 Sharaf Uddin Khashru, local politician
 Abdur Rahim, advocate, freedom fighter and politician

See also
 Beanibazar Upazila
 Upazilas of Bangladesh
 Districts of Bangladesh
 Divisions of Bangladesh

References

Source Bangladesh Population Census 2001, Bangladesh Bureau of Statistics.

External links
 List Of Union Parishad - Local Government Engineering Department
 Golapganj Upazila - Banglapedia
 Official Website - Golapganj Upazila